Serge Turgeon  (12 March 1946 – 18 May 2004) was a Quebec actor and union leader.

He was the president of the Union des artistes from 1985 to 1997.

In 2001, he was made a Knight of the National Order of Quebec. In 2003, he was made a Member of the Order of Canada.

References

External links
 
 National Order of Quebec citation  
 Order of Canada citation

1946 births
2004 deaths
Male actors from Quebec
Canadian male television actors
20th-century Canadian male actors
Canadian radio personalities
Trade unionists from Quebec
Knights of the National Order of Quebec
Members of the Order of Canada